Born a Crime: Stories from a South African Childhood is an autobiographical comedy book written by South African comedian Trevor Noah, published in 2016. A film adaptation is being produced by Paramount Players.

Narrative
The book details Trevor Noah growing up in his native South Africa during the apartheid era. As the mixed-race son of a white Swiss-German father and a black Xhosa mother, Noah himself was classified as a "coloured" in accordance to the apartheid system of racial classification. According to Noah, he stated that even under apartheid, he felt trouble fitting in because it was a crime "for [him] to be born as a mixed-race baby", hence the title of his book. 

In large part, the book is a paean to Noah's mother, Patricia Nombuyiselo, who grew up in a hut with fourteen occupants. Noah describes his mother as being stubborn, fearless, and an extraordinary teacher. She was a fiercely religious woman who took her son to three churches every Sunday, a prayer meeting on Tuesday, Bible study on Wednesday and youth church on Thursday, even when black South Africans were rioting in the streets and most people were cowering in their homes.

The book opens with young Noah being thrown out of a minibus by his mother because she thought the driver, a man from another South African tribe, was going to kill them. Noah develops social and mental agility, using his fluency in languages to break the barrier to his acceptance as a mixed race child. Growing up in poverty, he finds independence by earning money from selling illegal bootleg CDs, first at school and later on the streets of the notorious neighborhood of Alexandra. Noah describes the struggle of living with his abusive stepfather Abel. Through it all, his mother administers tough love and "old-school, Old Testament discipline". When Noah is arrested while driving an unregistered car taken from Abel's workshop without permission, he describes his fear of doing time in prison, and his mother lays down the law about crime and punishment. The book ends with the story of Noah's mother being shot in the head by his abusive stepfather while she was returning from church with her family, and her miraculous survival.

Reception
Published in November 2016, Born a Crime was received favorably by major U.S. book reviewers. It became a No. 1 New York Times Bestseller and was named one of the best books of the year by The New York Times, Newsday, Esquire, NPR, and Booklist. In early 2017, its title was used as a clue in the New York Times Crossword Puzzle.

U.S. senator Tammy Duckworth cited Born a Crime as the book that inspired her to write her 2021 memoir Every Day Is a Gift, in which she relates her experiences as the child of a white American father and a Thai mother. First Lady Jill Biden, an English professor at Northern Virginia Community College, assigned Born a Crime as required reading for an introductory English course.

Film adaptation
The memoir will be adapted into a film starring Lupita Nyong'o as Patricia, Noah's mother. Nyong'o will also produce the film with Noah through his production company, Ark Angel Productions. In March 2018, Liesl Tommy was hired to direct the film. The film will be produced by Paramount Players.

References

External links
Interview with Noah on Born a Crime, November 13, 2016, C-SPAN

The Daily Show
2016 non-fiction books
American autobiographies
Comedy books
American memoirs
South African autobiographies
Apartheid in South Africa
Spiegel & Grau books